Eternamente Bella (Eternally beautiful) is the third album by Mexican iconic Rock singer Alejandra Guzmán. It was released in 1990.

Track listing
 "Sheriff"  (J.R. Florez)
 "Un Grito en la Noche"  (Consuelo Arango)
 "Llama Por Favor"  (J.R. Florez; Gian Pietro Felisatti)
 "Eternamente Bella"   (J.R. Florez; Gian Pietro Felisatti)
 "Estoy Bien"  (J.R. Florez; Cayre)
 "Guante de Seda"  (José Vaca Flores; Miguel Blasco)
 "Que Me Das" (J.R. Florez; C. Valle)
 "Cuidado con el Corazón"  (J.R. Florez; C. Valle)
 "Di Que Si, Di Que No"  (Consuelo Arango)
 "Cámara de Gas" (J.R. Florez; Cayre)

Singles

1990 albums
Alejandra Guzmán albums
Fonovisa Records albums